A steel fence post, also called (depending on design or country) a T-post, a Y-post, or variants on star post, is a type of fence post or picket.  They are made of steel and are sometimes manufactured using durable rail steel.  They can be used to support various types of wire or wire mesh.  The end view of the post creates an obvious T, Y, or other shape.  The posts are driven into the ground with a manual or pneumatic post pounder.  All along the post, along the spine, there are studs or nubs that prevent the barbed wire or mesh from sliding up or down the post.  They are generally designated as 1.01, 1.25 or 1.33, referring to the weight in pounds per lineal foot. They are commonly painted with a white tip on top; white improves the visibility of the fence line.  

While T-Posts are more common in the United States, Y-posts are more common in Australia and New Zealand where they are sometimes called either star pickets or "Waratahs", after the company which registered a patent for them in 1926.  In New Zealand  Waratahs are often used for trail blazing.

In areas (such as the British Isles) where treated timber is relatively inexpensive, wooden fence-posts are used and steel ones are unusual for agricultural purposes.  In the British Isles steel posts are however often used for fencing into solid rock.  In this case a hole is drilled into the rock, and the post is fixed using cement or epoxy.
In Australia these are normally called a star picket and sizing is by length, normally one notch on the top and holes down the length. They are often covered in a black bituminous coating.

See also
Agricultural fencing
 Stanchion

References

Building materials
Fences
Fence
Steel objects